The following is a list of episodes for the British television programme, Geordie Shore that first aired on MTV on 24 May 2011.

Series overview

Episodes

Series 1 (2011)

Series 2 (2012)

Series 3 (2012)

Series 4 (2012)

Series 5 (2013)

Series 6 (2013)

Series 7 (2013)

Series 8 (2014)

Series 9 (2014)

Series 10 (2015)

Series 11 (2015)

Series 12 (2016)

Big Birthday Battle (2016)

Series 13 (2016)

Series 14 (2017)

Series 15 (2017)

Series 16 (2018)

Series 17 (2018)

Series 18 (2018)

Series 19 (2019)

Series 20 (2019)

Series 21 (2020)

Series 22 (2021)

Series 23 (2022)

Specials

References 

Geordie Shore
Episodes
Geordie Shore